Rahmat Akbari (born 20 June 2000) is an Afghan professional footballer who plays as a central midfielder for Brisbane Roar.

Club career

Brisbane Roar
On 6 October 2017, Akbari made his professional debut in the opening round of the 2017–18 season, replacing Nicholas D'Agostino in the 83rd minute as the Roar were beaten 2-0 by Melbourne City at AAMI Park.

Melbourne Victory
Akbari joined Melbourne Victory on a one-year loan in October 2018. He made his Victory debut on 11 November 2018, replacing James Troisi in the 89th minute as they demolished the Central Coast Mariners 4–1 at home.

Return to Brisbane Roar
On 4 June 2019, it was announced that Akbari had returned to Brisbane following the completion of his contract.

International career
Due to his Afghan heritage, Akbari is available to represent Afghanistan national football team. On 7 March 2022, it was reported that he had accepted a call-up for Afghanistan to play in two hybrid friendly matches.

Personal life
Born in Jaghori, Afghanistan to an ethnic Hazara family, Akbari was raised in Pakistan for the first five years of his life, before his family migrated to south-east Queensland as refugees in 2005.

Club

Notes

References

External links

2000 births
Living people
Afghan emigrants to Australia
Afghan expatriates in Pakistan
Association football midfielders
Australian people of Hazara descent
Australian people of Afghan descent
Sportspeople of Afghan descent
Australian soccer players
A-League Men players
National Premier Leagues players
Brisbane Roar FC players
Melbourne Victory FC players
Naturalised citizens of Australia
Hazara sportspeople
Brisbane Strikers FC players